Great Sampford is a village and civil parish on the junction of the B1053 and B1051 roads in the north-west of the English county of Essex. The population of the civil parish at the 2011 Census was 586. The village includes a primary school, two places of worship and one public house.  It is located three miles to the north-east of the town of Thaxted and eight miles to the south-east of Saffron Walden.

It used to have a RAF airfield called RAF Great Sampford. The River Pant runs through the south of the village.

It is connected to Hempstead by Howe Lane.

The village contains two churches - the Baptist Church, which also owns a small hall adjacent to the property, used by the community for the pre-school; and also a Church of England parish church, St Michael's.

Also in the village is a green and cricket club. Next to the green is a playground which includes a skatepark, donated by the National Lottery Fund, a zip wire funded by an Uttlesford District Council Community Grant, a small football pitch and a tennis court.

Governance
Great Sampford is part of the electoral ward called The Sampfords. The population of this ward at the 2011 Census was 1,900.

See also
Little Sampford
The Hundred Parishes

References

External links 

UK villages

Villages in Essex
Civil parishes in Essex
Uttlesford